Owensville is the third largest town and the smallest of the five larger communities in Gibson County, Indiana, United States. The population was 1,330 in 2017.

History
Owensville was established in 1817 by Phillip Briscoe, when he filed the town plat consisting of 52 parcels and five out-parcels. A fire in 1876 destroyed many of the wood framed businesses on the eastern side of the town square.

It was not until 1881 that Owensville incorporated.

On March 18, 1925, the Tri-State Tornado struck just northwest of the town, killing nine people.

On February 28, 2017, an EF3 wedge tornado, originating in Crossville, Illinois, passed to the south of the town, destroying or heavily damaging several structures along Indiana 65. The highway was closed for several days as power crews replaced several large power poles.

On April 8, 2024, Owensville, along with most of the rest of southwestern Indiana will view a total solar eclipse, lasting approximately 3 minutes and 55 seconds.

Geography
Owensville is located at  (38.271769, -87.690652).

Climate
The climate in this area is characterized by hot, humid summers and generally mild to cool winters.  According to the Köppen Climate Classification system, Owensville has a humid subtropical climate, abbreviated "Cfa" on climate maps, although areas just north of town have a humid continental climate. Local meteorologists often tend to use nearby Interstate 64 for comparison of local weather events.

In relation to climate, in 2004, the National Weather Service installed a NEXRAD Doppler Radar station approximately 2 miles west of the town.

Demographics

2010 census
As of the census of 2010, there were 1,284 people, 510 households, and 337 families living in the town. The racial makeup of the town was 97.9% White, 0.2% African American, 0.7% Native American, 0.2% Asian, and 0.9% from two or more races. Hispanic or Latino people of any race were 1.2% of the population.

There were 510 households, of which 33.1% had children under the age of 18 living with them, 48.8% were married couples living together, 12.9% had a female householder with no husband present, 4.3% had a male householder with no wife present, and 33.9% were non-families. 29.0% of all households were made up of individuals, and 15.7% had someone living alone who was 65 years of age or older. The average household size was 2.41 and the average family size was 2.97.

The median age in the town was 40.6 years. 24% of residents were under the age of 18; 7.8% were between the ages of 18 and 24; 23.5% were from 25 to 44; 24.8% were from 45 to 64; and 19.9% were 65 years of age or older. The gender makeup of the town was 47.5% male and 52.5% female.

2000 census
As of the census of 2000, there were 1,322 people, 523 households, and 359 families living in the town. The racial makeup of the town was 98.18% White, 0.23% African American, 0.38% Native American, 0.23% Asian, 0.53% from other races, and 0.45% from two or more races. Hispanic or Latino people of any race were 1.13% of the population.

There were 523 households, out of which 32.9% had children under the age of 18 living with them, 56.0% were married couples living together, 10.3% had a female householder with no husband present, and 31.2% were non-families. 28.3% of all households were made up of individuals, and 16.4% had someone living alone who was 65 years of age or older. The average household size was 2.41 and the average family size was 2.94.

In the town, the population was spread out, with 24.4% under the age of 18, 6.8% from 18 to 24, 27.7% from 25 to 44, 19.3% from 45 to 64, and 21.9% who were 65 years of age or older. The median age was 39 years. For every 100 females, there were 89.4 males. For every 100 females age 18 and over, there were 82.1 males.

The median income for a household in the town was $34,306, and the median income for a family was $40,263. Males had a median income of $35,294 versus $23,897 for females. The per capita income for the town was $15,916. About 5.2% of families and 8.9% of the population were below the poverty line, including 8.7% of those under age 18 and 8.1% of those age 65 or over.

Education

 South Gibson School Corporation
 K-8: Owensville Community School
 9-12: Gibson Southern High School

Former schools
 Owensville High School (merged into Gibson Southern High School in 1974)

Public library
The town has a lending library, the Owensville Carnegie Public Library.

Economy

Unlike Princeton and Fort Branch, Owensville's economy practically consists of a scant few family-owned business with only three exceptions: Goodlettsville, Tennessee-based Dollar General, Mount Carmel, Illinois-based Community Natural Gas, and Mount Vernon, Indiana-based Schultheis Insurance. The largest family-owned businesses in Owensville are Holder's Furniture and Holders Funeral Home (not owned by the same family). However, like Fort Branch, Owensville is largely surrounded by unincorporated subdivisions, primarily north of the town. The two largest employers of Owensville's residents are the Toyota Motor Manufacturing Indiana plant located halfway between Princeton and Fort Branch, as well as Gibson Generating Station located 5.5 miles north-northwest of Owensville, as well two coal mines that opened up in 2008 and 2014, located 6 miles and 1 mile north of town respectively.

Like the other communities in Gibson County, Owensville's prime economy is based on agriculture. The farms immediately around the town primarily produce corn, soybeans, strawberries, and wheat. Like many other communities along the Lower Wabash Valley, the surrounding Montgomery Township is particularly known for its watermelons, pumpkins, squash, cantaloupes, and zucchini, all heavily produced in the sandy bottom grounds located from the north to the southwest of the town. In addition, milo tends to be produced in place of corn in areas prone to flooding from the Wabash, Patoka, or Black Rivers or any of the other smaller creeks or streams that flow into them.

Owensville High School, which merged with Fort Branch and Haubstadt high schools to form Gibson Southern, had the first high school gymnasium in Indiana with a glass backboard. One of those backboards is now in the Indiana High School Basketball Hall of Fame in New Castle, Indiana.

Highways - local names
  Indiana State Road 65 - First, Brummitt, and Mill Streets from north to south
  Indiana State Road 165 - Brummitt Street west of Mill Street
  Indiana State Road 168 - Walnut Street east of Mill Street

Notable people
 Max Armstrong, farm news radio and television broadcaster reporting on American and worldwide agriculture
 Valeska Suratt, silent film star, Broadway actress, Vaudevillian, early fashion icon

References

External links
 Town of Owensville, Indiana website

 
Towns in Gibson County, Indiana
Towns in Indiana
Communities of Southwestern Indiana
Evansville metropolitan area
Populated places established in the 1790s